, TWMU, is a private university in Tokyo, Japan.

The University olso operates the Tokyo Women's Medical University Hospital within the campus, as well as a separate hospital in Yachiyo, Chiba.

History
In 1952, Tokyo Women's Medical College (TWMC) was established under the new educational system. In 1998, it was renamed to Tokyo Women's Medical University (TWMU).

References

External links

 

Private universities and colleges in Japan
Women's universities and colleges in Japan
Universities and colleges in Tokyo
Medical schools in Japan
Educational institutions established in 1900
1900 establishments in Japan
Shinjuku